The AEW World Championship is a professional wrestling world championship created and promoted by the American promotion All Elite Wrestling (AEW). It is the promotion's top championship for male singles competitors. The title was unveiled on May 25, 2019, and the inaugural champion was Chris Jericho. The current champion is MJF, who is in his first reign.

History

On January 1, 2019, the professional wrestling promotion All Elite Wrestling (AEW) was founded and its inaugural event and pay-per-view (PPV), Double or Nothing, was scheduled for May 25. The unveiling of the promotion's men's world championship was first teased on AEW's YouTube channel on May 22, where actor and comedian Jack Whitehall humorously attempted to reveal the title belt but struggled to get the championship out of its bag. During that same video, Whitehall revealed that the winner of Double or Nothing's Buy In pre-show battle royal, called the Casino Battle Royale, would face the winner of the PPV's main event at a future date to determine the inaugural AEW World Champion. AEW president Tony Khan confirmed that since the promotion would not have weight divisions, the AEW World Championship was not a "heavyweight championship".

At Double or Nothing, the pre-show Casino Battle Royale was won by "Hangman" Adam Page, while Chris Jericho defeated Kenny Omega in the PPV's main event, setting up the inaugural championship match. During the event, pro-wrestling veteran Bret Hart unveiled the AEW World Championship belt. Shortly after Double or Nothing, the inaugural championship match was scheduled for AEW's PPV, All Out, on August 31. At All Out, Jericho defeated Page in the main event to become the inaugural champion. The following day, it was reported by Tallahassee Police that the physical championship belt was stolen from Jericho's limousine while he was traveling; it was recovered on September 4. 

On the June 3, 2022, episode of Rampage, reigning champion CM Punk, who had won the title just days prior at Double or Nothing, announced that he was injured and required surgery. He initially wanted to relinquish the title; however, AEW president Tony Khan decided that an interim champion would be crowned until Punk's return, after which, Punk would face the interim champion to determine the undisputed champion. To determine the interim champion, AEW set up the AEW Interim World Championship Eliminator Series that would culminate in a match at AEW x NJPW: Forbidden Door on June 26, a co-promoted event between AEW and New Japan Pro-Wrestling (NJPW). The first two matches took place on the June 8 episode of Dynamite. A Casino Battle Royale opened the show, which Kyle O'Reilly won. O'Reilly then faced the number one ranked singles competitor Jon Moxley in the main event of the episode, which Moxley won. The third match took place on June 12 at NJPW's Dominion 6.12 in Osaka-jo Hall between Hiroshi Tanahashi and Hirooki Goto, which Tanahashi won; Tanahashi was originally scheduled to face Punk at Forbidden Door for the title before Punk's injury. At Forbidden Door, Moxley defeated Tanahashi to become the interim AEW World Champion. Punk made his return in early August and Moxley defeated Punk on the August 24 episode of Dynamite to become the undisputed champion.

After the All Out post-event media scrum on September 5, CM Punk, who had just won his second AEW World Championship at the event, got into a legitimate physical altercation with AEW executive vice presidents Kenny Omega and The Young Bucks (Matt Jackson and Nick Jackson), following berating comments he had made about them and others during the scrum. As a result, AEW president Tony Khan suspended all involved. On the September 7 episode of Dynamite, Khan announced that both the World Championship and Trios Championship, held by Omega and the Bucks, were vacated. Khan then announced that there would be a tournament to crown a new AEW World Champion. The  AEW Grand Slam Tournament of Champions began that same episode and continued across episodes of Dynamite and Rampage until its conclusion at Dynamite: Grand Slam on September 21. Tournament competitors included Bryan Danielson, "Hangman" Adam Page, Sammy Guevara, Darby Allin, Chris Jericho, and Jon Moxley. In the tournament final at Grand Slam, Moxley defeated Danielson to win the championship for a record third time.

Belt design

The standard AEW World Championship belt has five plates on a black leather strap. The large center plate prominently has the AEW logo at the center, with a diamond outline behind the logo. Above the logo is a banner that reads "WORLD", while below the logo is another banner that reads "CHAMPION". Below this banner is a nameplate to display the reigning champion's name. The two inner side plates are tall and skinny, with the AEW logo again at the center. Above and below this logo are two halves of the globe. The two outer side plates are similar to the inner ones but slightly smaller. The belt design was inspired by the Mid-South North American Heavyweight Championship belt, and AEW wanted their design to be significantly similar to that belt. It was created by well-known professional wrestling championship belt maker Dave Millican.

Custom design
On the November 30, 2022, episode of Dynamite, reigning champion MJF, who had just won the title at Full Gear on November 19, discarded the standard AEW World Championship belt, calling it trash, and unveiled his own custom version, which he dubbed the "Big Burberry Belt", or Triple-B for short. It features the exact same design as the standard belt; however, the leather strap is brown and fashioned in Burberry's trademark check pattern to match MJF's signature Burberry scarf.

Reigns

Chris Jericho was the inaugural champion. Jon Moxley has the most reigns at three and has the longest combined reign at 347 days. He also served as the interim champion in mid-2022 while reigning lineal champion CM Punk was out with an injury (this is not counted as one of Moxley's three reigns). Kenny Omega's reign is the longest at 346 days. CM Punk's second reign is the shortest at 3 days, while Punk also holds the shortest combined reign at 90 days. Jericho is the oldest champion when he won it at 48 years old, while MJF is the youngest champion at 26 years old.

MJF is the current champion in his first reign. He defeated Jon Moxley for the title at Full Gear on November 19, 2022, in Newark, New Jersey, which was MJF's Casino Poker Chip cash-in match.

Combined reigns

References

External links 
 Official AEW World Title History

All Elite Wrestling championships
World professional wrestling championships
2019 introductions